This is a list of flags used in Jamaica.

National Flag

Governor-General

Prime Minister

Military flags

Historical

See also
Flag of the West Indies Federation

Jamaica
 
Flags